The 2021 Delta State Statesmen football team represented Delta State University as a member of the Gulf South Conference (GSC) during the 2021 NCAA Division II football season. They were led by ninth-year head coach Todd Cooley. The Statesmen played their home games at Parker Field at Horace McCool Stadium in Cleveland, Mississippi.

Previous season
The Statesmen finished the 2019 season 6–4, 5–3 in Gulf South Conference (GSC) play, to finish third in the conference standings. On August 12, 2020, Gulf South Conference postponed fall competition in 2020 for several sports due to the COVID-19 pandemic. A few months later in November, the conference announced that there will be no spring conference competition in football. Teams that opt-in to compete would have to schedule on their own. The Statesmen did not compete in the 2020 season and opted out of spring competition.

Schedule

Rankings

Notes
1. Delta State's game against West Georgia on November 13, 2021, is a non-conference game despite both teams being GSC members.

References

Delta State
Delta State Statesmen football seasons
Delta State Statesmen football